Alma   is a village in Zgharta District, in the Northern Governorate of Lebanon.  Its population is  Maronite Christians and Sunni Muslim.

References

External links
 Ehden Family Tree

Populated places in the North Governorate
Zgharta District
Maronite Christian communities in Lebanon
Sunni Muslim communities in Lebanon